In Salah Airport is an airport in In Salah, Algeria .

Airlines and destinations

The only airline operating regular flights is Air Algérie. It connects the airport with two domestic destinations, as follows:

References

External links 
 Google Maps - In Salah
 Great Circle Mapper - In Salah
 
 

Airports in Algeria
Buildings and structures in Tamanrasset Province
Buildings and structures in In Salah Province